Liz Fielding (born in Berkshire, England) is an awarded British writer of over 60 romance novels published by Mills & Boon since 1992.

Biography
Liz Fielding was born in Berkshire, England, UK. She was educated at a girls' Convent School in Maidenhead. At 20, she went to Lusaka, Zambia, to work as a secretary. There she met her husband, John, a civil engineer, following him to Bahrain, Kenya and Botswana. They now live in a small village in Carmarthenshire, Wales. She has two adult children
.
In 1992, her first book was published — An Image of You, set in Kenya. Since then, she has continued publishing her contemporary romance novels.

Awards
The Best Man and the Bridesmaid (2001): RITA Award Best Traditional Romance winner
A Family of His Own (2005): Romantic Novelists' Association Love Story of the Year winner
The Marriage Miracle (2006): RITA Award Best Short Contemporary Romance winner

Bibliography

Single Novels
An Image of You (1992)
A Point of Pride (1993)
Instant Fire (1993)
Old Desires (1994)
A Stranger's Kiss (1994)
Dangerous Flirtation (1994)
Bittersweet Deception (1995)
Prisoner of the Heart (1995)
Conflict of Hearts (1996)
All She Wants for Christmas (1996)
The Bride the Baby and the Best Man (1996)
The Three Year Itch (1997)
Eloping with Emmy (1998)
Gentlemen Prefer... Brunettes (1998)
And Mother Makes Three (1999)
The Baby Plan (1999)
Dating Her Boss (1999)
His Desert Rose (2000)
The Best Man and the Bridesmaid (2000)
Her Ideal Husband (2000)
His Runaway Bride (2001)
The Bachelor's Baby (2001)
His Personal Agenda (2001)
Baby on Loan (2002)
City Girl in Training (2002)
The Billionaire Takes a Bride (2003)
A Surprise Christmas Proposal (2003)
A Family of His Own (2004)
A Wife on Paper (2004)
Her Wish-List Bridegroom (2004)
The Five-Year Baby Secret (2006)
Boardroom Bridegrooms (2007)
The Secret Life of Lady Gabriella (2007)
Reunited Marriage in a Million (2007)
The Valentine Bride (2007)
The Temp and the Tycoon (2008)
Wedded in a Whirlwind (2008)
SOS: Convenient Husband Required (2010)
Tempted by Trouble (2011)
Flirting with Italian (2011)
The Last Woman He'd Ever Date (2012)
The Bride's Baby (2014)

The Beaumont Brides Series
Wild Justice (1996)
Wild Lady (1997)
Wild Fire (1997)

Kavanagh Brothers Series
His Little Girl (1998)
A Suitable Groom (1998)

Boardroom Bridegrooms Series
The Corporate Bridegroom (2002)
The Marriage Merger (2002)
The Tycoon's Takeover (2002)

What Women Want Series Multi-Author
The Bridesmaid's Reward (2002)

High Society Brides Series Multi-Author
The Ordinary Princess (2003)

Heart to Heart Series Multi-Author
The Marriage Miracle (2005)
A Nanny for Keeps (2005)

Desert Brides Series Multi-Author
The Sheikh's Guarded Heart (2006)

Trading Places
'Christmas Angel for the Billionaire (2009)
Her Desert Dream (2009)

Collections
Mother's Day Pack (2001)

Omnibus In Collaboration
A Tender Christmas (2000) (with Emma Goldrick and Leigh Michaels)
Stranded in Paradise (2001) (with Jacqueline Baird and Miranda Lee)
The Engagement Effect: An Ordinary Girl / a Perfect Proposal (2001) (with Betty Neels)
City Girls (2002) (with Jessica Hart and Penny Jordan)
Wedding Countdown (2002) (with Helen Bianchin and Kim Lawrence)
Summer Brides (2003) (with Susan Fox and Miranda Lee)
Seduced by a Sultan (2004) (with Emma Darcy and Sandra Marton)
Strictly Business: The Temp and the Tycoon / The Fiance Deal (2004) (with Hannah Bernard and Penny Jordan)
In the Boss's Bed (2004) (with Sharon Kendrick and Carole Mortimer)
The Doubtful Marriage / Secret Wedding (2005) (with Betty Neels)
Risque Business (2005) (with Emma Darcy and Sharon Kendrick)
Bringing Up Baby (2007) (with Jessica Hart and Marion Lennox)
Baby On Board  (by Liz Fielding: Secret Baby, Surprise Parents) (2013) (with Patricia Thayer and Raye Morgan)
Weddings Collection (by Liz Fielding: His Runnaway Bride) (2014) (with Marie Ferrarella, Ally Blake, Debra D'Arcy, Carole Mortimer, Sandra Field and Sara Craven)
Wedding Wows (by Liz Fielding: Reunited: Marriage in a Million) (2015) (4x3 books 12 different authors)
Mistletoe Magic (by Liz Fielding: A Surprise Christmas Proposal) (2015) (with Carole Mortimer, Carol Marinelli, Judy Christenberry, Lucy Gordon and Joan Elliott Pickart)

Non fiction
Liz Fielding's Little Book of Writing Romance (2012)

External links
Liz Fielding's Official Website
Liz Fielding's Webpage in Harlequin Enterprises Ltd's Website
Liz Fielding's Webpage in Fantastic Fiction's Website

People from Berkshire
English romantic fiction writers
RITA Award winners
Living people
Year of birth missing (living people)
English women novelists
Women romantic fiction writers